Starkovo is a rural locality (a village) in Pereborskoye Rural Settlement, Beryozovsky District, Perm Krai, Russia. The population was 14 as of 2010.

Geography 
Starkovo is located on the Shakva River, 4 km north of  Beryozovka (the district's administrative centre) by road. Shishkino is the nearest rural locality.

References 

Rural localities in Beryozovsky District, Perm Krai